Gholamabad-e Khayyat (also Romanized as Gholāmābād-e Khayyāţ; also known as Khayāt, Khayyāţ, and Khayyaţ-e Gholāmābād) is a village in Firuzabad Rural District, Firuzabad District, Selseleh County, Lorestan Province, Iran. At the 2006 census, its population was 96, in 17 families.

References

Towns and villages in Selseleh County